Joseph Dedeyn (11 December 1880 – 4 June 1940) was a French bobsledder. He competed in the four-man event at the 1928 Winter Olympics.

References

External links
 

1880 births
1940 deaths
French male bobsledders
Olympic bobsledders of France
Bobsledders at the 1928 Winter Olympics
Place of birth missing